O'Sullivan is a surname of Irish origin. The surname is associated with the southwestern part of Ireland, and was originally found in County Tipperary and Kerry before the Anglo-Norman invasion. It is the third most numerous surname in Ireland. Roughly half of O'Sullivans hail from Ireland, with around 50% of the O'Sullivans residing there.

History 
 consists of ó (Old Irish úa) "grandchild, descendant", and the masculine genitive case of Súileabhán, viz. Súileabhán's grandchild/descendant. The female form in Modern Irish is Ní Shúileabhán; "ní" is the shortened form of iníon uí, iníon "daughter", uí, the genitive of ó "grandchild, descendant".

The etymology of the given name is uncertain. In his book titled The Surnames of Ireland, genealogist Edward MacLysaght states that “while there is no doubt that the basic word is súil (eye) there is a disagreement as to the meaning of the last part of the name.” It is interpreted as súildubhán ⇄ “little dark-eyed one” by Woulfe in Sloinnte Gaedheal is Gall, from súil ⇄  "eye," dubh ⇄ "dark/black," and combined with the diminutive suffix -án. Other suggested etymologies include "one-eyed" and "hawk-eyed."

The original bearer of the name, one Suilebhan mac Maolura, is recorded in legendary Irish genealogy as belonging to the 8th generation after Fíngen mac Áedo Duib, and placed in the 9th century.

MacLysaght lists Mac Criomhthain (MacCrohan) and Mac Giolla Chuda (MacGillycuddy) as notable branches of the Súileabhánaigh in County Kerry.

O'Sullivan is the regular anglicization of the Irish name. Less common spelling variants of the name include: Sullavan, Sullivant, Sillivant, Silliphant, and Sillifant.

Some O'Sullivans in the midlands and south Ulster were originally (O) Sullahan (from Ó Súileacháin, probably from súileach, quick-eyed, according to MacLysaght). This surname has now almost entirely changed to Sullivan.

People with surname

A 

 Aisling Clíodhnadh O'Sullivan (born 1984), Irish comedian, actress, and screenwriter
 Andy O'Sullivan (Irish republican), Irish republican hunger striker

C 

 Camille O'Sullivan (born 1975), Irish singer
 Cornelius O'Sullivan (1841–1907), Irish brewer's chemist

D 

 Daniel O'Sullivan (disambiguation), several people
 David O'Sullivan (disambiguation), several people
 Denis O'Sullivan (golfer) (born 1948), Irish golfer
 Denis J. O'Sullivan (1918–1987), Irish Fine Gael TD from Cork
 Denise O'Sullivan (born 1994), Irish footballer
 Diarmuid O'Sullivan (born 1978), Irish sportsman
 Donal Cam O'Sullivan Beare (1561–1613), Irish chieftain

E 

 Eddie O'Sullivan (born 1958), Irish rugby union coach and footballer
 Edward William O'Sullivan (1846–1910), Australian journalist and politician
 Eoghan Rua Ó Súilleabháin (Owen Roe O'Sullivan, 1748–1782), Irish Gaelic poet
 Eugene D. O'Sullivan (1883–1968), American Democratic Party politician from Nebraska

G 

 Gearóid O'Sullivan (1891–1948), Irish teacher, Irish Republican Army officer, barrister and Sinn Féin and Fine Gael politician
 Gerald Robert O'Sullivan VC (1888–1915), Irish soldier in the British Army, recipient of the Victoria Cross
 Gerry O'Sullivan (1936–1994), Irish Labour Party TD
 Gilbert O'Sullivan (born 1946), Irish-born, UK-based singer-songwriter, who had several hits in the 1970s
 Gillian O'Sullivan (born 1976), Irish race walker
 Grace O'Sullivan (born 1962), Irish environmentalist and politician
 Graham O'Sullivan, Kerry Gaelic footballer

H 

 Harry Sullivan (baseball) (1818–1919), Major League Baseball pitcher
 Harry Stack Sullivan, American psychologist and psychoanalyst

J 

 J. T. O'Sullivan (born 1979), American professional football player
 Jacquie O'Sullivan (born 1960), British singer and songwriter
 Jan O'Sullivan (born 1950), Irish Labour Party politician, currently a Teachta Dála (TD) for Limerick East
 Jeremiah O'Sullivan (1842–1896), Irish-born American Roman Catholic bishop
 Jerry O'Sullivan (disambiguation), several people
 John O'Sullivan (disambiguation), several people
 Sir John O'Sullivan (c. 1700 – c. 1760), a professional soldier in the service of France, known for his involvement in the Jacobite rising of 1745.

K 

 Kevin O'Sullivan (baseball) (born 1968), American college baseball coach

L 

 Laura O'Sullivan (born 1991), Welsh footballer
 Louise O'Sullivan (born 1973), Irish telecommunications executive
 Lance O'Sullivan (born 1963), New Zealand jockey, retired

M 

 Maggie O'Sullivan (born 1951), British poet, performer and visual artist
 Marcus O'Sullivan (born 1961), Irish coach and former middle-distance runner based in the United States
 Maureen O'Sullivan (1911–1998), Irish cinema actress
 Michael O'Sullivan (disambiguation), several people
 Mícheál Ó Súilleabháin (1950–2018), Irish composer and musician
 Mickey O'Sullivan (1932–2012), American college baseball coach
 Muiris Ó Súilleabháin (1904–1950), Irish writer; author of autobiography Fiche Blian ag Fás (Twenty Years A-Growing)

N 

 Nóirín O'Sullivan, first female Commissioner of the Garda Síochána

P 

 Paddy O'Sullivan (1918–1994), female Special Operations Executive spy during World 
 Pádraig O'Sullivan, Irish Fianna Fáil politician
 Pat O'Sullivan, American amateur golfer who won the 1951 Titleholders Championship
 Patrick O'Sullivan (born 1985), Canadian-born American professional ice hockey player
 Patrick O'Sullivan (disambiguation), several people
 Paul O'Sullivan Band (formed in 2014), Pop-Rock band where all four members are named Paul O'Sullivan.
 Peter O'Sullivan (disambiguation), several people

R 

 Richard O'Sullivan (born 1944), English actor, notable for his sitcom roles in the 1970s and 1980s
 Ronnie O'Sullivan (born 1975), English professional snooker player

S 

 Sean O'Sullivan (disambiguation), several people
 Seumas O'Sullivan (1879–1958), Irish poet and editor of The Dublin Magazine
 Shawn O'Sullivan (born 1964), Canadian boxer
 Siobhan O'Sullivan, Australian political scientist and political theorist
 Sonia O'Sullivan (born 1969), Irish Olympic runner
 Stephanie O'Sullivan (born 1959), Principal Deputy Director of National Intelligence

T 

 Terence Patrick O'Sullivan (1913–1970), English civil engineer
 Thomas C. O'Sullivan (c. 1858–1913), New York politician and judge
 Timothy O'Sullivan (Fianna Fáil politician) (1899–1969), Irish Fianna Fáil Party politician
 Timothy H. O'Sullivan (c. 1840–1882), American Civil War photographer
 Toddy O'Sullivan (1934–2021), Irish Labour Party politician
 Tyrone O'Sullivan (born 1945), Socialist and Chairman of Goitre Tower Anthracite Ltd., the owners of Tower Colliery.

V 

 Vince O'Sullivan (born 1957), American racewalker
 Vincent O'Sullivan (1868–1940), Decadent American writer
 Vincent O'Sullivan (born 1937, New Zealand poet

W 

 Wayne O'Sullivan (born 1974), Irish soccer player in Australia
 William S. O'Sullivan (1928–1971), Irish-American gangster

See also 

 O'Sullivan, Ancestral Irish family

Irish-language surnames
Surnames of British Isles origin
Surnames of Irish origin
English-language surnames